Château d'Aramont is a château in Verberie, Oise, France.

References

Châteaux in Oise